Season 4 of So You Think You Can Dance Canada is a dance reality show and competition that airs on CTV.  It is hosted by ETalk correspondent Leah Miller. It was the last season of the Canadian version of SYTYCD.

Auditions
Open auditions for this season were held in the following locations, with one or two guest judges joining Jean-Marc, Tré, and Luther at the Judges' Table:

Finals Week
Judges: Jean-Marc Généreux, Tré Armstrong, Blake McGrath, Luther Brown, Mary Murphy, Nico Archambault, Sean Cheesman, France Mousseau, Rex Harrington

Finals

Elimination chart

Women

Men

Performances

Week 1 (July 11, 2011)

Judges: Jean-Marc Généreux, Tré Armstrong, Blake McGrath, Luther Brown, Mary Murphy

Week 2 (July 18, 2011)
Judges: Jean-Marc Généreux, Tré Armstrong, Rex Harrington, Mary Murphy

Week 3 (July 25, 2011)
Judges: Jean-Marc Généreux, Tré Armstrong, Nico Archambault, Mary Murphy

Week 4 (August 1, 2011)
Judges: Jean-Marc Généreux, Tré Armstrong, Sergio Trujillo, Dan Karaty

Week 5 (August 8, 2011)
Judges: Jean-Marc Généreux, Tré Armstrong, Dan Karaty, Melissa Williams, Rex Harrington

Week 6 (August 15, 2011)
Judges: Jean-Marc Généreux, Tré Armstrong, Blake McGrath, Luther Brown, Mary Murphy

Week 7 (August 22, 2011)
Judges: Jean-Marc Généreux, Tré Armstrong, Stacey Tookey, Mary Murphy

Solos:

Week 8 (August 29, 2011)
Judges: Jean-Marc Généreux, Tré Armstrong, Blake McGrath, Mary Murphy

Solos:

Week 9 (September 5, 2011)
Judges: Jean-Marc Généreux, Tré Armstrong, Blake McGrath, Luther Brown, Mary Murphy
Group Dances:
Top 3 Girls: "What About Us"—ATB (Contemporary; Choreographer: Mia Michaels)
Top 3 Boys: "We Will Rock You"—Queen (Jazz; Choreographer: Melissa Williams)
Top 6: "Sail"—Awolnation (Contemporary; Choreographer: Sabrina Matthews)

Solos:

Result shows

Week 1 (July 12, 2011)
Group dance: Top 22: "On the Floor"—Jennifer Lopez feat. Pitbull (Hip-hop; Choreographer: Luther Brown)
Solos:

New partners:
Geisha Chin
François Pruneau

Week 2 (July 19, 2011)
Group dance: Top 20: "Haddipa"—Pritam & Mika Singh (Bollywood; Choreographer: Longinus Fernandes)
Solos:

Week 3 (July 26, 2011)
Group dance: Top 18: "El Tango de Roxanne"—Ewan McGregor, Jacek Koman & José Feliciano/"No Pregunto Cuantons Son"—Bajofondo (Tango/Musical theatre; Choreographer: Sergio Trujillo)
Solos:

Week 4 (August 2, 2011)
Group dance: Top 16: "God is Able"—Smokie Norful (Contemporary; Choreographer: Blake McGrath)
Solos:

Week 5 (August 9, 2011)
Group dance: Top 14: " Rumour Has It"—Adele (Jazz; Choreographer: Melissa Williams)
Solos:

New partners:
Yuliya Zavadska
Shane Simpson

Week 6 (August 16, 2011)
Group dance: "Dirty Dancer"—Enrique Iglesias feat. Usher & Lil Wayne (Ballroom; Choreographers: Jean-Marc Généreux and France Mousseau)
Solos:

Week 7 (August 23, 2011)
Group dance: "Heavy in Your Arms"—Florence and the Machine (Contemporary; Choreographer: Sabrina Matthews)
Solos:

Week 8 (August 30, 2011)
Group dance: "Vogue"—Madonna (Jazz; Choreographer: Sean Cheesman)
Solos:

Week 9 (September 11, 2011)
Judges: Jean-Marc Généreux, Tré Armstrong, Blake McGrath, Mia Michaels, Rex Harrington, Sean Cheesman, Sergio Trujillo, Mary Murphy, Luther Brown
Group dances:
Top 22 & Judges: "Showdown"—The Black Eyed Peas (Theatre; Choreographer: Sergio Trujillo)
Top 20: "Haddipa"—Pritam & Mika Singh (Bollywood; Choreographer: Longinus Fernandes)
Top 3 girls: "What About Us"—ATB (Contemporary; Choreographer: Mia Michaels)
Top 22: "On the Floor"—Jennifer Lopez feat. Pitbull (Hip-hop; Choreographer: Luther Brown)
Top 10: "Marching On" - OneRepublic; (Contemporary/September 11 attacks tribute; Choreographer: Stacey Tookey)
Top 6: "No Turning Back" (Contemporary; Choreographer: Sean Cheesman)

Judges' picks:

External links
 So You Think You Can Dance Canada

2011 Canadian television seasons
Season 04